Armidale, New South Wales is a city in Australia.

Armidale may also refer to:

Places
Armidale Dumaresq Shire
Armidale railway station
Armidale Airport
The Armidale School
Armidale High School
Electoral district of Armidale (abolished in 1981)

Other uses
Royal Australian Navy vessels named HMAS Armidale
Armidale-class patrol boat

See also

Armdale, Halifax, Nova Scotia, Canada
Armadale (disambiguation)